The Colonel James Drane House is a frontier I-house built from 1846 to 1848.  It is located on the historic Natchez Trace, at mile marker 180.7 on the modern Natchez Trace Parkway in French Camp, Mississippi, USA. It was built for James Drane, a state politician.

The house was listed on the National Register of Historic Places on July 21, 1983.

The house is an attraction for modern visitors to the Natchez Trace.

See also Old Natchez Trace segments listed on the National Register of Historic Places.

It has been listed on the National Register of Historic Places

References

Houses on the National Register of Historic Places in Mississippi
Houses completed in 1848
Houses in Choctaw County, Mississippi
Natchez Trace
National Register of Historic Places in Choctaw County, Mississippi